Poecilafroneta is a monotypic genus of Polynesian sheet weavers containing the single species, Poecilafroneta caudata. It was first described by A. D. Blest in 1979, and has only been found in New Zealand.

See also
 List of Linyphiidae species (I–P)

References

Linyphiidae
Monotypic Araneomorphae genera
Spiders of New Zealand